Bolshoy Mogoy is a rural locality (a selo) and the administrative center of Bolshemogoysky Selsoviet of Volodarsky District, Astrakhan Oblast, Russia. The population was 1,048 as of 2010. There are 10 streets.

Geography 
Bolshoy Mogoy is located on the Sarbay River, 19 km southeast of Volodarsky (the district's administrative centre) by road. Maly Mogoy is the nearest rural locality.

References 

Rural localities in Volodarsky District, Astrakhan Oblast